The Myanmar national basketball team represents Myanmar (Burma) in international basketball competitions and is controlled by the Myanmar Basketball Federation.

Myanmar is the world's most populous nation to never qualify for one of the Big Three international basketball competitions. (including the Summer Olympics, FIBA World Cup, Continental Championship)

Kit

Manufacturer
2017: Air Jordan

Competitive record

Summer Olympics
yet to qualify

World championships
yet to qualify

FIBA Asia Cup

Asian Games

1951: 5th (0–5)
1954 to 1962: Did not participate
1966: 11th (0–6)
1970 to 2018: Did not participate

Southeast Asian Championship

SEABA Cup
yet to participate

Southeast Asian Games

2011: 8th (0–4)
2013: 7th (0–6)
2015: 8th (1–4)
2017: 9th (0–5)
2019: 8th (0–4)

Roster
At the 2019 Southeast Asian Games:

Past rosters
Scroll down to see more.
Team for the 2015 Southeast Asian Games:

At the 2017 SEABA Championship:

References

External links
Asia-basket – Myanmar Men National Team
Presentation on Facebook

Men's national basketball teams
B
Basketball in Myanmar
1949 establishments in Burma
Basketball teams established in 1949